Myles W. Jackson (born Paterson, New Jersey on 25 November 1964) is currently the inaugural Albers-Schönberg Professor in the History of Science at the Institute for Advanced Study in Princeton, New Jersey and lecturer with the rank of professor of history at Princeton University. He was the inaugural Albert Gallatin Research Excellence Professor of the History of Science at New York University-Gallatin, Professor of History of the Faculty of Arts and Science of New York University, Professor of the Division of Medical Bioethics of NYU-Langone School of Medicine, Faculty Affiliate of the Engelberg Center on Innovation Law and Policy, NYU School of Law, and Director of Science and Society of the College of Arts and Science at NYU. He was also the inaugural Dibner Family Professor of the History and Philosophy of Science and Technology at Polytechnic Institute of New York University from 2007 to 2012. The chair is named after Bern Dibner (1897 – 1988), an electrical engineer, industrialist, historian of science and technology and alumnus of Polytechnic Institute of Brooklyn.

He received his Ph.D. in the History and Philosophy of Science from Cambridge University in 1991. Before joining the faculty of New York University, he taught at Harvard, the University of Pennsylvania, and the University of Chicago. He has been a Senior Fellow of the Dibner Institute for the History of Science and Technology at MIT and the Max-Planck-Institute for the History of Science in Berlin, Germany.

He is the author of numerous articles on the history, philosophy, and sociology of science and technology, with a particular emphasis on the cultural history of nineteenth-century German physics. He has also authored two books, Harmonious Triads: Physicists, Musicians, and Instrument Makers in Nineteenth-Century Germany  and Spectrum of Belief: Joseph von Fraunhofer and the Craft of Precision Optics, which won the Paul Bunge Prize of the German Chemical Society for the best work on the history of scientific instruments in 2005 and the Hans Sauer Prize for the best work on the history of inventors and inventions in 2007. Spectrum of Belief has been translated into German, Fraunhofers Spektren: Die Präzisionsoptik als Handwerkskunst. He has co-edited a collection of essays entitled Music, Sound, and the Laboratory, with the University of Chicago Press published in 2013. He is the editor of Perspectives on Science: Gene Patenting (MIT Press, 2015).  And his  monograph, The Genealogy of a Gene: Patents, HIV/AIDS, and Race, was published by MIT Press in 2015 (paperback 2017).

He was elected member of the Erfurt Academy of Sciences in 2009, of the German National Academy of Sciences - Leopoldina (Halle) in December 2011, and as a corresponding member of the Académie Internationale d'Histoire des Science in 2012. He has worked on issues of genetic privacy and the effects of intellectual property law and the patenting of human genes on research in molecular biology and served as an expert for the ACLU in their lawsuit against Myriad Genetics on the BRCA 1 and 2 gene patents. He has been the recipient of an Alexander-von-Humboldt Fellowship in 1999-2000, and in 2010 he received the Francis Bacon Prize in the History of Science and Technology from Caltech, where he was the Francis Bacon Visiting Professor of History of Science and Technology in 2012. In 2014 he received the Reimar Lüst/Humboldt Prize of the Alexander von Humboldt Foundation and was named Bosch Public Policy Fellow of the American Academy in Berlin. He was a fellow at the Wissenschaftskolleg (Institute for Advanced Study) in Berlin for the academic year 2016-17. He was a member of the Board of Directors of the American Friends of the Alexander von Humboldt Foundation from 2019 to 2022. He was elected to acatech, the German Academy of Engineering in 2023. He is currently finishing up a manuscript exploring the collaborations between physicists, electrical engineers, physiologists, and musicians on improving the fidelity of early German radio broadcasts and the invention of the trautonium in Berlin during the 1920s and '30s.

References

External links
https://web.archive.org/web/20151020060422/http://www.gallatin.nyu.edu/academics/faculty/mwj214.html
http://mitpress.mit.edu/catalog/item/default.asp?ttype=2&tid=11589
http://mitpress.mit.edu/catalog/item/default.asp?ttype=2&tid=3502
http://www.wallstein-verlag.de/9783835304505.html
http://www.aclu.org/free-speech_womens-rights/aclu-challenges-patents-breast-cancer-genes
http://www.nytimes.com/2010/03/31/nyregion/31about.html
https://web.archive.org/web/20110605164100/http://www.hss.caltech.edu/humanities/fbacon
http://www.leopoldina.org
https://www.leopoldina.org/fileadmin/redaktion/Mitglieder/CV_Jackson_Myles_W._D.pdf
http://www.nyu.edu/about/news-publications/news/2012/01/09/nyu-professor-myles-jackson-elected-to-german-national-academy-of-sciences.html
http://www.avh.org

21st-century American historians
21st-century American male writers
Living people
1964 births
Writers from Paterson, New Jersey
New York University faculty
Alumni of the University of Cambridge
Polytechnic Institute of New York University faculty
Institute for Advanced Study faculty
Historians from New Jersey
American male non-fiction writers